This list contains all cultural property of national significance (class A) in the canton of Basel-Landschaft from the 2009 Swiss Inventory of Cultural Property of National and Regional Significance. It is sorted by municipality and contains 36 individual buildings, 6 collections and 22 archaeological finds.

The geographic coordinates provided are in the Swiss coordinate system as given in the Inventory.

Aesch

Allschwil

Anwil

Arisdorf

Arlesheim

Augst

Bennwil

Birsfelden

Bottmingen

Brislach

Bubendorf

Burg im Leimental

Buus

Duggingen

Gelterkinden

Itingen

Kilchberg

Lampenberg

Langenbruck

Läufelfingen

Laufen

Lausen

Liesberg

Liestal

Maisprach

Münchenstein

Muttenz

Nenzlingen

Oltingen

Ormalingen

Pfeffingen

Pratteln

Reigoldswil

Rothenfluh

Rümlingen

Sissach

Waldenburg

Wenslingen

Wintersingen

Ziefen

Zwingen

Zunzgen

References
 All entries, addresses and coordinates are from:

External links
 Swiss Inventory of Cultural Property of National and Regional Significance, 2009 edition:

PDF documents: Class B objects
Geographic information system